Show Court 3 is the equal-fifth largest tennis court at Melbourne Park, in Melbourne, Australia, the venue of the Australian Open.

Overview
Show Court 3 has always been available on a walk-up basis for spectators at the Australian Open with a ground pass. It is located to the immediate north of Margaret Court Arena.

It is also utilised by members of the general public outside of the Australian Open, as is the case for all other outdoor courts at Melbourne Park. Prior to commencement of the 2020 Australian Open, the court was installed with a $1 million shaded grandstand covering most of the seating, allowing spectators to seek relief from the hot Australian summer sun. The court is similar in size and stature to the No. 2 and No. 3 courts at the Wimbledon Championships, and is usually populated in the first week of the tournament for late night matches. It has a permanent seating capacity of 3,000.

See also
 List of tennis stadiums by capacity
 Show Court 2 (Melbourne Park)

References

External links
 Show Court 3 at Austadiums.com
 Show Court 3 at AusOpen.com

Sports venues in Melbourne
Tennis venues in Australia
Buildings and structures in the City of Melbourne (LGA)
Sport in the City of Melbourne (LGA)